Dave Danforth is an American publisher and newspaper owner. In the United States, he pioneered micro-daily newspapers beginning in the late 1970s, including Colorado's Aspen Daily News.

Career

In 1978, Danforth, a Yale University dropout who later returned to graduate from the Ivy League school, then working as a stringer for The Denver Post and for some national publications, began printing up a one-sheet "missive" and distributing 2,000 copies around Aspen. "It was typewritten, both sides, with a little band of ads one inch high, a free handout," former Aspen journalist Andy Stone recalls. "He had a taste and a flair for sensational journalism."

The Aspen Daily News, which soon converted to a tabloid format on traditional newsprint, has had a competition over decades with The Aspen Times, founded as a daily in 1881 before converting to a weekly in the 1920s. In the face of The News' incursion, The Times introduced a daily edition beginning in 1988; as of 2016, The Times continues to publish daily. Danforth sold the Daily News in 2017.

In 1989, Danforth, together with partners Mark Guerringue and Adam Hirshan, co-founded the free New Hampshire daily The Conway Daily Sun. The newspaper dropped its Monday edition in 2009 but continues to publish Tuesdays through Saturdays.

In 1995, Danforth, together with partners James Pavelich and Dave Price (publisher), co-founded the free The Daily News (Palo Alto). A year later, Pavelich and Price voted to remove Danforth from the newspaper's management. Danforth unsuccessfully sued his partners, citing financial mismanagement, and the newspaper itself was sold in 2005 to Knight Ridder, which itself was later sold. Pavelich and Price ultimately returned to Palo Alto to compete, as Palo Alto Daily Post, against their former newspaper.

In 1999, Danforth co-founded California's Berkeley Daily Planet, which discontinued publication in 2010.

In 2001, Danforth, together with Carolyn Sackariason and Ross Furukawa, co-founded California's Santa Monica Daily Press, which continues to publish as of 2016. Furukawa remains as president.

References

Living people
American newspaper publishers (people)
Yale University alumni
Year of birth missing (living people)